Sago is a starch extracted from the stems of metroxylon sagu palms.

Sago may also refer to:

In plants:
 Metroxylon sagu or sago palm, a palm from which sago is extracted
 Cycas revoluta or sago cycad, a cycad from which starch also known as sago is extracted 
 Zamia integrifolia, another cycad plant sometimes called wild sago

In food:
 Sago pudding, a sweet pudding made from sago or tapioca
 Sap Sago, US brand of Swiss Schabziger cheese
 Sago soup, a Cantonese variant of tapioca pudding
 Sago tapioca, pearls prepared from cassava root

In places:
 Mount Sago, Indonesia
 Sago, Burkina Faso
 Sago, Côte d'Ivoire
 Sago, West Virginia, United States
 Sago Lane, Singapore
 Sago Street, Singapore
 Sago Township, Minnesota, United States

In other uses:
 Sago Mine disaster, West Virginia, 2006
 Sago palm weevil or red palm weevil, Rhynchophorus ferrugineus
 Sago worm, the larva of the sago palm weevil
SAGO, the Scientific Advisory Group for Origins of Novel Pathogens

See also 
 Starch